Johann Georg Heinrich Backofen (6 July 1768 in Durlach – 10 July 1830? in Darmstadt) was a German clarinetist, composer and painter.

In his time Backofen enjoyed great fame; he was not only known as a composer for, and virtuoso of the clarinet but also played the harp, flute and basset horn.

His year of death is not known with certainty; a year of 1839 is found in some documents.

Selected works
 Deux valses et deux allemandes à deux et quatre mains pour le piano (2 Waltzes and 2 Allemandes for Piano 2- and 4-Hands), Op. 1 (published 1834)
 Concerto in B major for clarinet and orchestra, Op. 3 (Bonn, 1809?)
 13 Variazioni sull' aria "Ey mein lieber Augustin" for harp, Op. 4 (Hamburg, 1801)
 Concertante for harp, basset horn and cello ad libitum, Op. 7 (Leipzig, 1800?)
 Concertante for harp, viola and cello ad libitum, Op. 8
 Quintet in F major for basset horn and string quartet, Op. 9
 Sinfonia concertante in A major for 2 clarinets and orchestra, Op. 10 (Leipzig, 1810?)
 3 Duos concertants for 2 clarinets, Op. 13 (Leipzig, 1803)
 Quintet for clarinet and string quartet, Op. 15 (Leipzig, 1805?)
 Concerto in E major for clarinet and orchestra, Op. 16 (Leipzig, 1809?)
 Concerto in E major for clarinet and orchestra, Op. 24 (Leipzig, 1821?)
 Grand Duo for 2 flutes, Op. 37
 Concerto in F major for basset horn and orchestra
 Concerto in F major for horn and orchestra (Leipzig, c.1823)
 3 Duets for 2 clarinets (C major, G major, F major)
 3 Menuette for harp
 Sonata in F major for violin (or flute) and harp
 Sonata for harp (and violin ad libitum) (Leipzig, 1795)
 Sonata facile for violin (or flute) and harp (or piano)
 Thema mit Variationen (Theme and Variations) for harp
 16 Variations sur l'air "Ah! vous dirai je maman" for harp
 Variations for bassett horn and orchestra

Pedigogical
 Harfenschule mit Bemerkungen über den Bau der Harfe und deren neuere Verbesserungen (Harp School) (Leipzig, 1801)
 Anweisung zur Klarinette (Neue teoretisch-prachtische Klarinett Schule) nebst einer kurzen Abhandlung über das Bassett-Horn (Leipzig, 1803)
 Anweisung zur Klarinette, mit besonderer Hinsicht auf die in neuern Zeiten diesem Instrument beigefügten Klappen (completely revised edition of the above) (Leipzig, 1824)

Recordings
Backofen: Clarinet Concertos

External links

Recording: Backofen: Clarinet Concertos 
Backofen's Second Clarinet Method, 1824 (Facsimile Edition with English Translation)

1768 births
1830s deaths
German clarinetists
German male composers
German composers